Rodrigo Paz Pereira (born 22 September 1967) is a Bolivian politician serving as senator for Tarija since 2020. A member of Civic Community, he has been the leader of the First the People civic group —the alliance's primary partner in Tarija— since 2019. As a member of United to Renew, he previously served as mayor of Tarija from 2015 to 2020 and as president of the Tarija Municipal Council from 2010 to 2015. Prior to that, he served as a uninominal member of the Chamber of Deputies from Tarija representing circumscription 46 from 2005 to 2010 and circumscription 49 from 2002 to 2006, on behalf of the Revolutionary Left Movement, the party of his father, former president Jaime Paz Zamora.

Early life and career

Early life and education 
Rodrigo Paz Pereira was born on 22 September 1967 in Santiago de Compostela, Spain, the first-born son of Carmen Pereira Carballo and Jaime Paz Zamora, founder and head of the Revolutionary Left Movement (MIR), future vice president (1982–1984), and future president (1989–1993). Paz spent his childhood and adolescence in political exile, a by-product of his father's political activity during the military dictatorships of the 1970s and early 1980s. He studied in numerous Jesuit schools in several countries, and when democracy was re-established in Bolivia, he attended the San Ignacio School in La Paz. Later, Paz studied at the American University in Washington, D.C., where he graduated with a bachelor's degree in international relations with a major in economics and a master's in political management. During the presidency of Hugo Banzer —whose government was supported by the MIR— he worked as a commercial attaché at the Bolivian embassy in Spain and served as chargé d'affaires to the World Trade Organization.

Political career 
Together with his brother, Jaime Paz Pereira, he was one of the so-called "political heirs" of the country, a group of younger statesmen whose political careers had been facilitated by their connections to the country's prominent party leaders. In the 2002 general elections, the MIR nominated Paz as its candidate for Tarija in circumscription 49 (Avilés-Méndez), a major stronghold of support for the party. Winning the seat with a comfortable majority, he was elected to represent the district for the 2002–2007 National Congress. Though the significant social conflicts of the time culminated in the collapse of the traditional party system, Paz's already-established political career survived. When the legislature's mandate was shortened by two years, he was presented by a diminished MIR as its candidate for Tarija in circumscription 46 (Cercado) for the 2005 general elections, in alliance with Social Democratic Power of Jorge Quiroga.

Mayor of Tarija 
By 2006, the inability of the MIR to achieve the required two percent vote threshold in that year's constituent assembly elections led to the loss of its national registration. With that, Paz joined the ranks of United to Renew (UNIR), led by the ex-Mirista and Tarija mayor Oscar Montes. In the 2010 regional elections, he headed UNIR's list of councillors in Tarija in support of Montes' bid for a third mayoral term. From 2010 to 2015, he served under Montes as the president of the Tarija Municipal Council and was nominated to succeed Montes as UNIR's mayoral candidate in the 2015 regional elections. Paz swept the race, winning almost sixty percent of the city's votes.

At his mayoral inauguration on 30 May 2015, Montes highlighted that "it has been the MIR, then UNIR, who will govern Tarija for twenty consecutive years". However, Paz's own political project, focused on "rescuing the great Mirista root" of his father's party, ultimately resulted in the rupture of his alliance with Montes and his departure from UNIR just a year into his term, under accusations that he was trying to "destroy UNIR in order to structure the Revolutionary Left Movement". The culmination of Paz's political project came on 3 April 2019 with the establishment of the First the People (Primero la Gente; PG) civic group. With himself at the head, PG aimed at consolidating municipal and departmental sectors into a political alliance whose "ideology is the people".

After the 2019 political crisis, Paz's mayoral term was extended by an additional year. However, he cut it short by tendering his resignation on 20 October 2020 to take office in the Plurinational Legislative Assembly. After four days of debate, the Municipal Council voted to accept Paz's resignation and elected its president, Alfonso Lema, as his successor.

Chamber of Senators

Elections 
In the 2019 general elections, PG signed an alliance with the Christian Democratic Party (PDC), which presented Paz's father, ex-president Jaime Paz Zamora, as its presidential candidate. However, shortly thereafter, Paz Zamora withdrew his candidacy due to internal disagreements with the PDC, leading Paz to shift his support to Carlos Mesa of Civic Community (CC). On 3 February 2020, PG finalized an alliance with CC, presenting Paz as the coalition's candidate for first senator for Tarija.

Tenure 
During his tenure, Paz was a vocal proponent of census reform in light of the process scheduled for late 2022. In January of that year, Paz presented a bill to establish Departmental Institutes of Statistics (IDEs), aimed at generating departmental, municipal, and regional statistical information. If passed, the legislation would have decentralized the census process —overseen by the National Institute of Statistics (INE)— which Paz assured would make the 2022 census "a census of the people". Paz also criticized a lack of transparency regarding what preparations and activities were underway to carry out the census. On 7 February, the CC caucus delivered a petition to the Ministry of Development Planning requesting a report on planned activities. By early March, CC noted that it had not received a response so far. Failing the creation of IDEs due to a lack of time to establish such institutions, Paz also proposed the formation of inter-institutional monitoring committees made up of governorates, municipalities, universities, regional chambers, social organizations, and other relevant groups to guarantee transparency in the process.

Commission assignments 
 Chamber of Senators Directive (Second Vice President of the Senate; 4 November 2020 – 4 November 2021)
 Rural Indigenous Nations and Peoples, Cultures, and Interculturality Commission (President; 10 November 2021–present)

Electoral history

References

Notes

Footnotes

Bibliography

External links 
 Senate profile Chamber of Senators .

1967 births
Living people
21st-century Bolivian politicians
American University alumni
Bolivian senators from Tarija
Civic Community politicians
Children of national leaders
Mayors of Tarija
Members of the Bolivian Chamber of Deputies from Tarija
Members of the Senate of Bolivia
People from Santiago de Compostela
People from Tarija
Revolutionary Left Movement (Bolivia) politicians
Social Democratic Power politicians